Michael Bernays (27 November 183425 February 1897) was a German literary historian,  and an important Goethe and Shakespeare scholar.

Life
He was born in Hamburg. His father, Isaac Bernays, died when he was fourteen years old. His adjustments were radically different from that of his two brothers, Jacob Bernays (1824-1881) and Berman Bernays (1826-1879), due to the traumatic loss of his father at an early age or other factors.  He studied first law and then literature at Bonn and Heidelberg.

Career
He obtained a considerable reputation by his lectures on Shakespeare at Leipzig and an explanatory text to Beethoven's music to Egmont. Having refused in 1866 an invitation to take part in the editorship of the Preussische Jahrbücher, in the same year he published his celebrated Zur Kritik und Geschichte des Goetheschen Textes.

He confirmed his reputation by his lectures at the university of Leipzig, and in 1873 accepted the post of extraordinary professor of German literature at Munich specially created for him by Ludwig II of Bavaria. Thus, he became first ever professor of modern German literary history at Munich University. He was for a while reader to Ludwig II of Bavaria. In 1874 he became an ordinary professor, a position which he resigned only in 1889 when he settled at Carlsruhe. He died there on 25 February 1897.

He along with Ludwig Geiger started a critical Goethe philosophy.  Geiger edited the influential Goethe-Jahrbuch for more than thirty years. 

At an early age he became a Jewish Christian, whereas his brother Jakob remained a Rabbinical Jew. Among his other publications were: Briefe Goethes an F. A. Wolf (1868); Zur Entstehungsgeschichte des Schlegelschen Shakespeare (1872); and an introduction to Hirzel's collection entitled Der junge Goethe (1875). He also edited a revised edition of Voss's translation of the Odyssey. From his literary remains were published Schriften zur Kritik und Litteraturgeschichte (1895–1899).

Works 
 Zur Kritik und Geschichte des Goetheschen-Textes (1866)
 Briefe Goethes an F. A. Wolf (1868)
 Zur Entstehungsgeschichte des Schlegelschen Shakespeare. Leipzig 1872, new ed. Celtis Verlag, Berlin 2013, 
 An introduction to Hirzel's collection entitled Der junge Goethe (1875)
 A revised edition of Voss's translation of the Odyssey
 (from his literary remains) Schriften zur Kritik und Litteraturgeschichte (1895–1899)

References

External links 
 Michael Bernays on the Jewish Encyclopedia.
 Michael Bernays on  Messianic Judaism Wiki.

1834 births
1897 deaths
19th-century German Jews
University of Bonn alumni
Converts to Protestantism from Judaism